Chionodes dammersi is a moth in the family Gelechiidae. It is found in North America, where it has been recorded from California and Arizona.

The larvae feed on Eriogonum elongatum, Eriogonum inflatum, Eriogonum abrorescens, Eriogonum fasciculatum, Eriogonum grande, Eriogonum latifolium and Eriogonum parvifolium.

References

Chionodes
Moths described in 1936
Moths of North America